The 2009 NACAC Cross Country Championships took place on March 7, 2009.  The races were held at the Chain of Lakes Park in Orlando, Florida, United States.  A detailed report of the event was given.

Complete results were published.

Medallists

Medal table (unofficial)

Note: Totals include both individual and team medals, with medals in the team competition counting as one medal.

Participation
According to an unofficial count, 86 athletes (+ 6 guests) from 7 countries participated.

 (9)
 (2)
 (25 + 6 guests)
 (16)
 (12)
 (3)
 (19)

See also
 2009 in athletics (track and field)

References

NACAC Cross Country Championships
NACAC Cross Country Championships
NACAC Cross Country Championships
NACAC Cross Country Championships
2009 in American sports
International track and field competitions hosted by the United States